Charleswood is a residential neighbourhood in the northwest quadrant of Calgary, Alberta. It is located east of Crowchild Trail and the University of Calgary. It borders the Nose Hill Park to the north and the Confederation Park to the southeast.

Charleswood is represented in the Calgary City Council by the Ward 4 councillor.

Demographics

Residents in this community had a median household income of $63,828 in 2000, and there were 12.9% low income residents living in the neighbourhood. As of 2000, 17.6% of the residents were immigrants. A proportion of 11.6% of the buildings were condominiums or apartments, and 18.4% of the housing was used for renting.

Education
The community is served by Banff Trail Bilingual Elementary, Collingwood Elementary and Senator Patrick Burns Junior High public schools, as well as by St. Francis Senior High  and St. Margaret Elementary & Junior High Catholic schools.

See also
List of neighbourhoods in Calgary

References

External links
Triwood Community Association

Neighbourhoods in Calgary